Dorcasina is a genus of beetles in the family Cerambycidae, containing the following species:

 Dorcasina grossa (LeConte, 1873)
 Dorcasina matthewsii (LeConte, 1869)

References

Lepturinae